Charlotte Brändström (born 30 May 1959) is a Swedish-French film and TV director.

Early life
Born in Paris of Swedish parents, Charlotte Brändström graduated from the American Film Institute (AFI) in Los Angeles.

Filmography

References

External links
 
 

1969 births
Living people
French women film directors
French women screenwriters
French screenwriters
Writers from Paris
French people of Swedish descent